Saint Wdamun  (also Wadamoun, Wdamon, Wdammon, Wdamen, Eudaemon or Saint Wadamoun El Armanty is the first Coptic Christian martyr in Upper Egypt.

Life and Martyrdom
The saint is the first to be martyred in Egypt, but the first at the level of the martyrs of Christianity, where he believed in Christ when he came with the Virgin Mary to Egypt, when the news of the arrival of the Virgin with her son Jesus went to see him and then declared his faith in Jesus, when he back to his home,  he told people about his faith in Jesus, they took revenge on him and killed him with their swords.
After the spread of Christianity in Egypt, people set up a church to replace his house with the name of the Virgin Mary and St.Wadamoun, which is still present in Hermopolis, Egypt.

Notes

Saints from Roman Egypt
Coptic Orthodox saints